The 2003 Primera B de Chile was the 53rd completed season of the Primera B de Chile.

Table

See also
Chilean football league system

References

External links
 RSSSF 2003

Primera B de Chile seasons
Primera B
Chil